Fitch notation, also known as Fitch diagrams (named after Frederic Fitch), is a notational system for constructing formal proofs used in sentential logics and predicate logics. Fitch-style proofs arrange the sequence of sentences that make up the proof into rows. A unique feature of Fitch notation is that the degree of indentation of each row conveys which assumptions are active for that step.

Example 

Each row in a Fitch-style proof is either:
 an assumption or subproof assumption.
 a sentence justified by the citation of (1) a rule of inference and (2) the prior line or lines of the proof that license that rule.

Introducing a new assumption increases the level of indentation, and begins a new vertical "scope" bar that continues to indent subsequent lines until the assumption is discharged. This mechanism immediately conveys which assumptions are active for any given line in the proof, without the assumptions needing to be rewritten on every line (as with sequent-style proofs).

The following example displays the main features of Fitch notation:

0 |__                        [assumption, want P iff not not P]
1 |   |__ P                  [assumption, want not not P]
2 |   |   |__ not P          [assumption, for reductio]
3 |   |   |   contradiction  [contradiction introduction: 1, 2]
4 |   |   not not P          [negation introduction: 2]
  |
5 |   |__ not not P          [assumption, want P]
6 |   |   P                  [negation elimination: 5]
  |
7 |   P iff not not P        [biconditional introduction: 1 - 4, 5 - 6]
0.  The null assumption, i.e., we are proving a tautology
1.  Our first subproof: we assume the l.h.s. to show the r.h.s. follows
2.  A subsubproof: we are free to assume what we want. Here we aim for a reductio ad absurdum
3.  We now have a contradiction
4.  We are allowed to prefix the statement that "caused" the contradiction with a not
5.  Our second subproof: we assume the r.h.s. to show the l.h.s. follows
6.  We invoke the rule that allows us to remove an even number of nots from a statement prefix
7.  From 1 to 4 we have shown if P then not not P, from 5 to 6 we have shown P if not not P; hence we are allowed to introduce the biconditional

See also 

 Natural deduction

References 

 Frederic Brenton Fitch, Symbolic Logic: An introduction, Ronald Press Co., 1952.
 Jon Barwise and John Etchemendy, Language, Proof and Logic 1st edition as PDF, Seven Bridges Press and CSLI, 1999.

External links 
 Fitch's Paradox of Knowability
 An online Java application for proof building 
 A Web implementation of Fitch proof system (propositional and first-order) at proofmod.mindconnect.cc
 The Jape general-purpose proof assistant (see Jape)
 Resources for typesetting proofs in Fitch notation with LaTeX (see LaTeX)
 FitchJS: An open source web app to construct proofs in Fitch notation (and export to LaTeX)
 Natural deduction proof editor and checker in Fitch notation

Philosophical logic
Logical calculi